Shakerley could refer to:

 Shakerley, English town

People:

 Lady Elizabeth Shakerley (1941–2020), British socialite
 Sir Geoffrey Shakerley (1932–2012), English aristocrat
 Jeremy Shakerley (1626–1653?), English astronomer